Konstantinos Kyranakis (born 19 April 1987) is a Greek politician, serving as a Member of the Hellenic Parliament for Athens B3, as a member of New Democracy party.

Early life and education 

He was born in Luxembourg and raised in Athens and Brussels. He has graduated at the European School of Brussels in 2005, holds a bachelor's degree in Law from the University of Athens and a MA in Strategic Communication from the American College of Greece.

Kyranakis has worked as a digital strategist since 2008. He was the project manager for a part of the digital campaign of Jean-Claude Juncker for President of the European Commission in 2014. and the head of the digital campaign of Kyriakos Mitsotakis for President of New Democracy in 2015.

He is a member of the International Republican Institute, and has co-founded BrainGain, an initiative aiming at reversing brain drain for Greece. Forbes Magazine nominated and selected Kyranakis in the 30 under 30 list for the year 2016.

Political career 

In 2013, Kyranakis was elected president of the Youth of the European People's Party, Europe's largest political youth organisation with over 1 million members from 40 countries and re-elected in 2015.

He was a candidate for the European Parliament in 2014 and was appointed deputy spokesman for New Democracy in 2016.

Kyranakis serving as a Member of the Hellenic Parliament for the South of Athens since July 7, 2019, as a member of New Democracy party

Personal life 
Kyranakis married Eleni Atherinou on August 22, 2020. Besides Greek, he is fluent in English and French.

References

External links 
 

Living people
1987 births
Greek MPs 2019–2023
New Democracy (Greece) politicians
Politicians from Athens